Yevgeny Kafelnikov defeated Michael Stich in the final, 7–6(7–4), 7–5, 7–6(7–4) to win the men's singles tennis title at the 1996 French Open. Kafelnikov remains the most recent man to have won both the singles and men's doubles titles at the same edition of a major.

Thomas Muster was the defending champion, but lost in the fourth round to Stich.

Pete Sampras was attempting to complete the career Grand Slam, but lost in the semifinals to Kafelnikov. This marked his career-best result at the French Open.

Future three-time champion and world No. 1 Gustavo Kuerten made his first appearance in the main draw of a major, losing to Wayne Ferreira in the first round. Three-time champion Mats Wilander made his final major appearance, losing to Todd Martin in the second round.

Seeds
The seeded players are listed below. Yevgeny Kafelnikov is the champion; others show the round in which they were eliminated.

  Pete Sampras (semifinals)
  Thomas Muster (fourth round)
  Andre Agassi (second round)
  Michael Chang (third round)
  Goran Ivanišević (fourth round)
  Yevgeny Kafelnikov (champion)
  Jim Courier (quarterfinals)
  Thomas Enqvist (first round)
  Marcelo Ríos (fourth round)
  Wayne Ferreira (fourth round)
  Arnaud Boetsch (second round)
  Albert Costa (second round)
  Richard Krajicek (quarterfinals)
  Marc Rosset (semifinals)
  Michael Stich (finalist)
  MaliVai Washington (first round)

Qualifying

Draw

Finals

Top half

Section 1

Section 2

Section 3

Section 4

Bottom half

Section 5

Section 6

Section 7

Section 8

External links
 1996 French Open Men's Singles draw Association of Tennis Professionals (ATP)
 1996 French Open – Men's draws and results at the International Tennis Federation

Men's Singles
1996